Villa Montezuma is a Queen Anne style mansion in San Diego, California's Sherman Heights neighborhood that was added to the National Register of Historic Places in 1971.

Jesse Shepard residence 
It was built in 1887 for Jesse Shepard, who lived there for about a year before relocating to Paris, then selling the property in late 1889. John Mallon's Pacific American Decorative Company made windows for the mansion.

Friends of Villa Montezuma 
In 1969, five members of what is now known as the San Diego History Center began work to arrange for the city's purchase of the house for use as a museum and cultural center. After opening for such purpose on November 12, 1972, a volunteer organization known as the Friends of Villa Montezuma (FOVZ) continued for the next four decades to maintain the property as a house museum. Hundreds of weddings were held at the museum over that time, providing a steady source of revenue for the historical society. An accidental fire in March 1986 went through the second floor and destroyed over half of the roof, though a restored museum opened again in late June 1987 in time for the house's 100th anniversary. Amid an economic downturn and building foundation safety concerns, the museum closed to the public in 2006 and the FOVZ centered on raising funds for a much needed restoration, incorporating that year as an independent 501(c)(3) organization.

Tours 
From 2015 through 2020, to satisfy requirements of a federal CDBG grant that was used to restore the foundation, roof, and chimneys, the museum was open four mornings a year for free interior tours, approximately quarterly, with visitor registration via the San Diego Parks and Recreation Department.

As of October 2021, the museum reopened for regular paid tours.

References

External links

 San Diego Citywide LGBTQ Historic Context Statement, pages 15, 99–100, 109
 Description by Waldemar Tonner, who lived in the home with Shepard

1887 establishments in California
Houses in San Diego
National Register of Historic Places in San Diego
Queen Anne architecture in California